Type 93 may refer to:
 Type 93 Air-to-Ship Missile
 Type 93 flamethrower
 Type 93 mine
 Type 93 Surface-to-Air Missile
 Type 93 torpedo